macOS Ventura (version 13) is the nineteenth and current major release of macOS, Apple's desktop operating system for Mac computers. The successor to macOS Monterey, it was announced at WWDC 2022 on June 6, 2022, and launched on October 24, 2022. It is named after the city of Ventura and is the tenth macOS release to bear a name from the company's home state of California. The macOS 13 Ventura logo and default wallpaper resemble an abstract California poppy. 

The first developer version was released on June 6, 2022, while the first public beta was released on July 11, 2022.

History

New features  
macOS Ventura includes changes, many related to productivity, and adds two apps ported from iOS and iPadOS: Weather and Clock. Freeform was added in an update to all three operating systems.

New system features 
 Stage Manager, which provides an alternative interface for multitasking, in addition to the previous Mission Control.

New apps 
 Weather: shows detailed weather forecasts. Clicking on the Weather widget now opens this app, not The Weather Channel's website.
 Clock: displays world time and manages alarms, stopwatches, and timers. Clicking on the Clock Widget now opens this app, not the Date & Time section of System Preferences.
 Freeform, a whiteboard app that supports real-time collaboration (added in ver. 13.1 ).

Changes
 Mail adds "send later" and "undo send" options and includes improvements to search, email organization, and formatting.
 Spotlight produces richer search results; with Live Text, it can return pictures that contain the queried text.
 Safari adds Shared Tab Groups and Passkeys, uses WebAuthn for password-less account management, gets a redesigned sidebar, and gains AVIF support.
 Messages now allows the user to edit and unsend recent iMessages, similar to iOS and iPadOS 16.
 FaceTime gets Handoff, the ability to transfer a call between multiple Apple devices.
 Continuity Camera, a feature that allows a user's iPhone to wirelessly serve as a front-facing camera, with support for Desk View on some iPhones.
 System Preferences is renamed System Settings and gets a new user interface and re-organized categories based on the iOS/iPadOS Settings app.
 Because of this, the app-specific "Preferences..." menu bar item has been renamed "Settings..." for all apps.
 Photos app: iCloud Shared Photo Library allows multiple members of iCloud Family Sharing to add, edit, and delete photos in the same photo library.
 The Game Center dashboard is redesigned.
 Font Book gets a new visual design.
 Maps adds support for routes with multiple stops.
 Siri gets redesigned to match its since iOS 14 and iPadOS 14.
 Apple Music adds the ability for the user to mark artists as "favorites" and receive new music notifications from those artists.
 Print dialogs have been redesigned. Many users report that Print Presets no longer save all essential printer features (paper type, duplexing, color mode, print quality, etc.) requiring settings to be manually selected with every print job.
 Ability to play ambient background sounds as an accessibility feature in System Settings.
 New backgrounds and screensavers.
 A bug was fixed in Disk Utility concerning the verification of Time Machine backup volumes.
 Improved game controller support.
 Apple's Virtualization framework: better support for multitouch gestures in macOS Ventura VMs, support for graphics acceleration, folder sharing, and Rosetta 2 in Linux VMs.
 Metal 3, with support for spatial and temporal image upscaling.
 Live Text now works in videos.
 iCloud
 Advanced Data Protection: optional end-to-end encryption for all iCloud data except emails, calendars and contacts.
 Support for physical security keys
Security
 Rapid Security Response, a new update mechanism to rapidly patch security vulnerabilities without having to install a full system update; according to Apple, these patches will not require a reboot.
 New Login Items section in System Settings (in the General pane), which shows all programs that start on boot (including all LaunchAgents and LaunchDaemons for both the user and the system). In previous versions of macOS, the Login Items list in the "Users & Groups" pane only showed programs that registered themselves to be displayed, and most malware would not have been listed.
 Confirmation before allowing data connections with USB-C accessories, to prevent malicious USB-C chargers from installing malware.
 Gatekeeper now checks the notarization of third-party apps every time they are launched.
 Lockdown Mode, which prevents USB devices from connecting when the Mac is asleep, blocks the installation of MDM profiles, limits the risk of malicious attachments in the Messages app, and removes just-in-time compilation for JavaScript in Safari.
 Built-in apps cannot be moved from the cryptographically-verified Signed System Volume to another location where they could be tampered with.

Removed features 

The Preview app on Mac no longer supports PostScript (.ps) and Encapsulated PostScript (.eps) files. Printing of such files remains possible by accessing the Printer Queue from System Settings and dragging the file into the queue window.
Network Utility has been removed.
 The Network Locations feature was removed from the graphical user interface. It can still be accessed from the command line.

Known problems 
 Unicode Hex Input does not work if the code point number is 0xx0 (first digit and fourth (last) digit in the four‑digit number are zero)

Supported hardware 
macOS Ventura supports Macs with Apple silicon and Intel's 7th-generation Kaby Lake chips or later, and drops support for various models released from 2013 to 2017. Ventura supports the following Mac models:

 iMac (2017 or later)
 iMac Pro (2017)
 MacBook (2017)
 MacBook Air (2018 or later)
 MacBook Pro (2017 or later)
 Mac Mini (2018 or later)
 Mac Pro (2019)
 Mac Studio (2022)
AirPlay to Mac, always-on "Hey Siri", 4K HDR streaming, and Spatial Audio are not supported on all models. Offline dictation, Live Captions, Portrait Mode in FaceTime, and "Reference mode" (which allows users to use an iPad as a secondary reference monitor) only work on Apple silicon Macs.

By using patch tools, macOS Ventura can be unofficially installed on earlier models that are officially unsupported, such as a 2017 MacBook Air and a 2016 MacBook Pro. Using these methods, it is possible to install macOS Ventura on models as early as a 2008 MacBook Pro or a 2007 iMac.

Release history 
The first developer beta of macOS 13 Ventura was released on June 6, 2022.

See Apple's main pages for Ventura release notes: for consumers, for enterprise, as well as their current security content page.

Timeline of Mac operating systems

References 

2022 software
ARM operating systems
Computer-related introductions in 2022
18
X86-64 operating systems